The Cold War Jets Collection (CWJC) was a museum based at Bruntingthorpe Aerodrome, a former Royal Air Force station located near Lutterworth, Leicestershire in the United Kingdom. 

C Walton Ltd owns the airfield, who hosts the CWJC, this is made up of several  aviation preservation groups, such as the Lightning Preservation Group, the Buccaneer Aviation Group, Classic British Jets Collection and GJD AeroTech.

The airfield was open on Sundays from 10.00 am to 4.00 pm when aircraft were displayed. Demonstrations of fast taxi runs were carried out on the two open days held each year, usually May Bank Holiday Sunday and August Bank Holiday Sunday. Individual Groups also held events of their aircraft, these included fast taxi runs, static engine runs, photoshoots etc.

It was reported in June 2020 that the museum had permanently closed. New developments have since come to fruition throughout 2021, with the hope of reopening the museum on a nearby site but still on the current airfield.
As of 2022 this development is progressing well, new hard standing for aircraft has now been built along with new public car parking. The Museum hosted its first public event on the new site in November 2022, marking the first step before reopening fully.

Taxiable aircraft

Aircraft currently in a taxiable state, are:

Static aircraft

References

Citations

Bibliography

External links
 Lightning Preservation Group

Aerospace museums in England